Since the 1999 final was cancelled due to rain, no defending champions were declared.

Guillaume Raoux and Jan Siemerink were the 1998 champions, but Raoux did not compete this year. Siemerink teamed up with Sjeng Schalken and lost in first round to Andrei Pavel and Gabriel Trifu.

Martin Damm and Cyril Suk won the title by defeating Paul Haarhuis and Sandon Stolle 6–4, 6–7(5–7), 7–6(7–5) in the final.

Seeds

Draw

Draw

References
 Official Results Archive (ATP)
 Official Results Archive (ITF)

Rosmalen Grass Court Championships
2000 ATP Tour